Joseph Diego Gerut (born September 18, 1977) is a former Major League Baseball center fielder who played for several teams between 2003 and 2010.

Amateur career
A native of Elmhurst, Illinois, Gerut attended Willowbrook High School, and later Stanford University. In 1996 and 1997, he played collegiate summer baseball with the Harwich Mariners of the Cape Cod Baseball League and was named a league all-star in 1996.

Professional career
Drafted by the Colorado Rockies in the second round of the 1998 Major League Baseball Draft, he was traded to the Indians with Josh Bard, for Jacob Cruz on June 2, . Gerut finished fourth in American League Rookie of the Year voting and winning the Sporting News Rookie of the Year Award. In , Gerut's season ended when he tore the anterior cruciate ligament in his right knee. Gerut was acquired by the Chicago Cubs from the Indians on July 18, in exchange for Jason Dubois. On July 31, 2005, Gerut was acquired by the Pittsburgh Pirates in exchange for fellow outfielder Matt Lawton. He played briefly for the Pirates in 2005, then did not play for them at all in 2006; on March 8, the Pirates released Gerut and he did not play during that year.

On January 21, Gerut signed a minor league contract with an invitation to spring training with the San Diego Padres. Gerut played very well in a starting role for the Padres during the 2008 season. He finished the year with a line of .296 batting average, .351 OBP, and .494 slugging percentage with 14 HR and 48 RBI mostly in center field.

On April 13, 2009, he recorded the first hit and home run at Citi Field against the New York Mets on the third pitch off Mets starting pitcher Mike Pelfrey. Gerut became the first player in major league history to open a new ballpark with a leadoff homer.

On May 21, 2009, Gerut was traded to the Milwaukee Brewers for outfielder Tony Gwynn Jr.  On May 8, 2010, Gerut hit for the cycle, going 4 for 6 in the Brewers 17-3 victory over the Arizona Diamondbacks.  On August 13, 2010, Gerut was unconditionally released by the Milwaukee Brewers.  On August 19, 2010, Gerut was signed to a minor league contract by the San Diego Padres.

In 2010, he was chosen as the 12th-smartest athlete in sports by  Sporting News.

On January 20, 2011, Gerut was signed to a minor league contract by the Seattle Mariners.

On February 27, 2011, Gerut announced his retirement, citing his heart was no longer in the game, claiming he "didn't want to be a player that plays for only his paycheck."

Broadcasting career
On August 1, 2018, Gerut served as analyst for the Facebook Live broadcasting crew working the Indians-Twins game.

See also
 List of Major League Baseball players to hit for the cycle

Notes

External links
Jody Gerut's Quick Look Baseball

1977 births
Living people
Cleveland Indians players
Chicago Cubs players
Pittsburgh Pirates players
San Diego Padres players
Milwaukee Brewers players
African-American baseball players
Baseball players from Chicago
Major League Baseball outfielders
People from Elmhurst, Illinois
Stanford Cardinal baseball players
Salem Avalanche players
Carolina Mudcats players
Akron Aeros players
Buffalo Bisons (minor league) players
Portland Beavers players
Arizona League Brewers players
Harwich Mariners players
21st-century African-American sportspeople
20th-century African-American sportspeople